The University Students' Council, also known in abbreviation as KSU, is a Maltese national students' union. It is the oldest extant student organization in Europe. The KSU was established by Arturo Mercieca (1878-1969), later Chief Justice Sir Arturo Mercieca (1924-1940), in 1901 as the Comitato Permanente Universitario, also previously known as University Permanent Committee. The students union is involved in students' national and international politics.

The KSU represents Maltese students on a national and international level who attend:
The University of Malta
The G. F. Abela Junior College
The Medical School
The Malta Centre for Restoration.

History 
The student organization 'Kunsill Studenti Universitarji' (KSU) was founded in 1901.

Students' contribution
The organization promotes and recognizes students contributions, given at the University of Malta and other related education institutions, which represents. KSU is a forum where students may express their opinion not related to their studies. The KSU gives an opportunity to contribute to the University of Malta.

Electoral system

The electoral system is a first past the post one, whereby a block vote winning the majority of votes elects all its candidates, to the executive committee. This brought a system of block-voting between student organisations.

Aims 

The KSU is an evolving organization. It finds its roots in a set of simplified objectives.  Over the past century, since its foundation, the KSU has been working to:

Represent students in whatever issues concern them, whether it is on a national or international level; 
Serve as an official link between students and the relevant authorities; 
Achieve the democratisation of education in Malta; 
Coordinate the activities with other organizations; 
Cultivate an interest in students in the fields of education, socio-political and cultural issues and 
Assuring the highest possible quality level in Higher Education.

European Students' Union 

On an international level, KSU is a full member of European Students' Union (ESU), the international union of students in Europe. The ESU represesents 45 National Unions of Students in 34 European countries, including KSU. It represents over 10 million students European students. It is regarded by the European Commission, the Council of Europe, UNESCO, the Bologna Follow-up Group, the European University Association (EUA) and various other stakeholders in education as being the leading representative voice of students in Europe.  Throughout the years various Maltese Students have formed part of ESU Committees. KSU is an official founding member of MEDNET (Mediterranean Network of Student Representatives).

Freshers' Week 

Since 2007 the KSU welcomes freshers (students) on campus at the start of every new academic year at the University of Malta.
Every year the KSU encourages students to visit the University campus to meet their course mates, check out the company stands and get freebies.

Library hours 

The library of University of Malta, in collaboration with the KSU's proposal, launched its extended hours to facilitate students with their studies. In 2013, the library hours were extended for the Health Sciences library, to increase the study areas available and accommodate more students.

Student organisations 

The following is a list of students organizations at the University of Malta:

1-Up Club - University Pop Culture Society
+9 Studenti
AEGEE-Valletta - The European Students' Forum
ASA - Arts Students’ Association
ASCS - Association of Students of Commercial Studies
Betapsi - Psychology Students' Association
CommA - Communications Students' Association
CSA - Criminology Students' Association
DESA - Department of English Student Association
ELSA Malta - The European Law Students' Association
ESN - Erasmus Student Network
ESO - European Studies Organisation
Greenhouse
GUG - Gozo University Group
GħSK - The Criminology Students` Society
GħSL - The Law Students' Society
GħST - Theology Students' Association
HOASA - The History of Art Student Association
IAESTE - International Association for the Exchange of Students for Technical Experience
ICTSA - Information Communications Technology Students' Association
INSITE - The Student Media Organisation
JCA - Junior Chamber of Advocates
JEF Malta - Young European Federalists Malta
Kite Factory
KSJC - Junior College Students' Council
LOOP
MADS - The Malta Association of Dental Students
MHSA - Malta Health Science Student Association
MIRSA - International Relations Students Association
MKSU - University Students' Catholic Movement
MMSA - Malta Medical Students' Association
MOVE - Progressive Students
Moviment Graffitti (defunct from university)
MPSA - Malta Pharmaceutical Students' Association
MUFC - Malta University Film Club
MUHS - Malta University Historical Society
MUSC - Malta University Sports Club
MUST
OSQ – Organizazzjoni Studenti Qwiebel
PULSE
S-Cubed - Science Students' Society
SACES - Society for Architecture and Civil Engineering Students
SDM - Maltese Christian Democrat Students
SĦS - Studenti Ħarsien Soċjali
SIERA - Social Science Students’ Integrative, Educational and Research Association
TDM2000 Malta
TSA - Tourism Students' Association
UESA - University Engineering Students' Association
UMGS - University of Malta Geographical Society
University Bible Group
USTA - University Student Teachers' Association
We Are - Students LGBT Organisation
Y4TE - Youth For The Environment
YouthCom - Youth & Community Studies Students’ Organisation

Presidents 
 2022-present: Alexandra Gaglione
 2021/2022: Neil Zahra
 2020/2021: Matthew Xuereb 
 2019/2020: William Farrugia 
 2018/2019: Carla Galea 
 2017/2018: Robert Napier
 2016/2017: Stephanie Dalli
 2015/2016: Rebecca Micallef
 2014/2015: Gayle Lynn Callus 
 2013/2014: Thomas Bugeja 
 2012/2013: Mario Cachia
 2011/2012: Stefan Balzan  
 2010/2011: Carl Grech  
 2009/2010: Carl Grech  
 2008/2009: Roberta Avellino 
 2007/2008: David Herrera 
 2006/2007: David Herrera 
 2005/2006: Anthony F. Camilleri 
 2004/2005: Paul Gonzi 
 2003/2004: Justin Fenech 
 2002/2003: James Scicluna 
 2001/2002: David Gonzi 
 2000/2001: Karl Gouder 
 1999/2000: Claire Cassar 
 1998/1999: Jacques René Zammit 
 1997/1998: Emanuel Delia
 1996/1997: Emanuel Delia

References

External links
Official website

Students' unions
Education in Malta
Student organizations established in 1901
1901 establishments in Malta